An overrun brake (called a surge brake when invented) is a brake system commonly used on small trailers, where the motion of the trailer with respect to the towing vehicle is used to actuate the brake.

The early systems were fitted with a spring system which was not very effective.

Later systems were fitted with a sliding mechanism within the coupling, which enables the drawbar to move back and forth relative to the trailer chassis. When the towing vehicle brakes, the inertia of the trailer slides the mechanism, this in turn uses the travel of this mechanism to pull on the brake rod which applies the brakes. The sliding mechanism contains a damper to even out the shock loading transmitted from the tow vehicle. Therefore, the inertia of the trailer provides the force to apply the brakes.

Some systems have a ball hitch that is normally straight, but when the lead vehicle starts braking, the trailer pushes forward on the ball hitch, pitching it up which then activates a variable hydraulic brake system. Upon activating the trailer slows down pulling back on the hitch again, making it level then that shuts off the braking system.

Some systems may also have a switch that disables the system so the brakes won't lock while you're backing up. Other systems take the backup lamp input from the lead vehicle that shuts the system off automatically.

Common Uses 
There are many uses for such a braking system, but they are commonly sold as kits for medium weight trailers or rental trailers and used for trailers in the marine environment. They are often used on boat trailers (typically above 2000lbs or 907kg) instead of electrical brakes as electrical brakes can both get shorted out in the water when not properly sealed and most vehicles towing medium weight trailers will not have an electrical braking system equipped. Surge brakes easily fill the gap of heavy enough to have brakes, but light enough not to require a more advanced braking systems that vehicles towing these kinds of trailers would not be equipped with. That same rule applies to both the commonly sold kits and the rental trailers.

Issues
The older spring based systems had performance issues, and an insufficiently well designed and implemented system can be nonfunctional and undrivable. The problem with these spring based systems happens as follows:
 As the towing vehicle brakes, the trailer travels forward, sliding the mechanism, for a distance before trailer braking begins.
 The speed difference & inertia built up by now results in the trailer brakes being rapidly & progressively applied ever harder, until trailer speed drops to below towing vehicle speed
 due to this, the brakes are now soon entirely released
 since the towing vehicle is still slowing down, the whole cycle repeats itself. The result is not only severe vibration, but the lack of effectiveness of the trailer brakes leaves the towing vehicle to do nearly all the braking. The front vehicle thus also fails to brake effectively, and lateral stability is also compromised, risking a jackknife situation.
 as well the system can also result in unintentionally applying the brakes while reversing the vehicle.  
 and during inclines, the angle results in a lower braking capability.

The problem can be eliminated by minimising slack spring travel, and by reducing the amount of trailer braking force applied for a given drawbar force. However this results in the towing vehicle bearing some of the trailer braking load, something the towing vehicle is often not designed to do. The result is compromised braking.

Because of its issues, all OECD countries limit the maximum road legal towable weight (UK up to 3500kg or 7716lbs) using such a braking system.
The newer damped systems operate more effectively and are not prone to the same problems as the spring systems.

See also
 Freewheel

External links
 kfz-tech.de
 freepatentsonline.com
 freepatentsonline.com
 "What You Should Know About Trailer Brakes." Popular Science, July 1969, pp. 111–113

Brakes

de:Bremse (Kraftfahrzeug)#Auflaufbremse